Lauren Louise Filer (born 22 December 2000) is an English cricketer who currently plays for Somerset, Western Storm and Welsh Fire. She plays as a right-arm medium bowler.

Early life
Filer was born on 22 December 2000 in Bristol. Her twin sister, Jodie, plays for Somerset alongside her.

Domestic career
Filer made her debut for Somerset in 2018 against Nottinghamshire, taking one wicket. She achieved her best List A bowling figures in 2019, taking 3/21 against Essex. She appeared in one match for Somerset as they won the West Midlands Group of the 2021 Women's Twenty20 Cup. In the 2022 Women's Twenty20 Cup, she took five wickets in five matches for Somerset, at an average of 8.80.

In 2020, Filer played for Western Storm in the Rachael Heyhoe Flint Trophy. She appeared in 3 matches, taking 3 wickets at an average of 23.33, including taking 2/24 against Sunrisers. The following season, she appeared in all seven matches for Western Storm in the Rachael Heyhoe Flint Trophy, taking five wickets at an average of 42.40. She also played four matches in the Charlotte Edwards Cup, taking two wickets. She also signed to play for Welsh Fire in The Hundred, but did not play a match. In 2022, she played eight matches for Western Storm, across the Charlotte Edwards Cup and the Rachael Heyhoe Flint Trophy. In the Rachael Heyhoe Flint Trophy, she was the side's leading wicket-taker, with 11 wickets at an average of 22.63, and hit her maiden half-century, scoring 58* against Central Sparks. She was also ever-present for Welsh Fire in The Hundred, taking two wickets in six matches. At the end of the 2022 season, it was announced that Filer had signed her first professional contract with Western Storm.

References

External links

2000 births
Living people
Cricketers from Bristol
Somerset women cricketers
Western Storm cricketers
Welsh Fire cricketers